Keery is a surname. Notable people with the surname include:

Joe Keery (born 1992), American actor and musician.
Natalia Keery-Fisher (born 1986), English actress and singer
Neville Keery (born 1939), Irish poet and politician
Stan Keery (1931–2013), English footballer

See also
Kerry (name)